A rack of lamb or carré d'agneau (though this may also refer to other cuts) is a cut of lamb cut perpendicularly to the spine, and including 16 ribs or chops. At retail, it is usually sold 'single' (sawn longitudinally and including the 8 ribs on one side only), but may also be sold as a "double rack of lamb", with the ribs on both sides. Alternatively, two French trimmed racks may be placed together with the ribs interlinked; when configured this way it is often known as a 'Guard of honour' .

Rack of lamb is usually roasted, sometimes first coated with a herbed breadcrumb persillade. The tips of the bones are sometimes decorated with paper frills called manchettes.


Crown roast

Two or three single racks of lamb tied into a circle make a "crown roast of lamb". Crown roasts are sometimes cooked with (ground-lamb) stuffing in the middle.

Frenching

Rack of lamb is often French trimmed (also known as Frenching in the United States), that is, the rib bones are exposed by cutting off the fat and meat covering them. Typically, three inches (7–8 cm) of bone beyond the main muscle (the rib eye or Longissimus dorsi) are left on the rack, with the top two inches (5 cm) exposed.

See also

 List of lamb dishes

Notes

Lamb dishes
Cuts of lamb